Mihri Hatun, also known as Lady Mihri and Mihri Khatun (born ca. 1460 – died 1506 AD; مهری خاتون), was an Ottoman poet. She was the daughter of a kadi (an Ottoman judge) and according to sources she spent most of her life in and near Amasya, in Anatolia. Documentation places her as a member of the literary circle of Prince Ahmed, the son of Sultan Bayezid II.

The myth that has grown up around her states that she “fell in love many times but insists that all these loves were chaste and innocent, and that she led a life of unremitting virtue.” Lewis notes that though described as both “beautiful and ardent, she remained unmarried.” However, because the major sources on her life, tezkires, were written by male contemporaries who over emphasized virginity and sexuality as indicitive of her morality, it is impossible to interpret the extent to which she was innocent and chaste. She is referred to as the "Sappho of the Ottomans".

Poetry
Lady Mihri's poems reveal an artist grounded in both Persian Literature, writing in such forms as the Gazel, as well as the recipient of a deep literary education. Modern critics, such as Bernard Lewis describe her style as “retaining remarkable freshness and simplicity.”

One of her more popular lines goes as follows: “At one glance/ I love you/ With a thousand hearts ... Let the zealots think/ Loving is sinful/ Never mind/ Let me burn in the hellfire/ Of that sin.”

Another is: “My heart burns in flames of sorrow/ Sparks and smoke rise turning to the sky/ Within Me the heart has taken fire like a candle/ My body, whirling, is a lighthouse illuminated by your image.”

Gazel

Ben umardım ki seni yâr-ı vefâ-dâr olasın
Ne bileydim ki seni böyle cefâ-kâr olasın

Hele sen kaaide-î cevrde eksik komadın
Dostluk hakkı ise ancağ ola var olasın

Reh-i âşkında neler çektüğüm ey dost benim
Bilesin bir gün ola aşka giriftâr olasın

Sözüme uymadın ey asılası dil dilerim
Ser-i zülfüne anın âhiri ber-dâr olasın

Sen ki cân gül-şeninin bi gül-i nev-restesisin
Ne revâdır bu ki her hâr ü hasa yâr olasın

Beni âzâde iken aşka giriftâr itdin
Göreyim sen de benim gibi giriftâr olasın

Bed-duâ etmezem ammâ ki Huda’dan dilerim
Bir senin gibi cefâ-kâra hevâ-dâr olasın

Şimdi bir hâldeyüz kim ilenen düşmanına
Der ki Mihrî gibi sen dahi siyeh-kâr olasın

References

Sources
Damrosch and April Alliston. The Longman Anthology of World Literature: The 17th and 18th Centuries, the 19th Century, and the 20th Century: V. II (D, E, F) Longman, Inc.  
Halman, Talât Sait and Jayne L. Warner. Nightingales & pleasure gardens: Turkish love poems. Syracuse University Press (2005) .
Havlioğlu, Didem. “On the Margins and between the Lines: Ottoman Women Poets from the Fifteenth to the Twentieth Centuries.” Turkish Historical Review 1, no. 1 (n.d.): 25–54. https://www.academia.edu/806853/On_the_margins_and_between_the_lines_Ottoman_women_poets_from_the_fifteenth_to_the_twentieth_centuries
Havlioglu, Didem. Poetic Voice En/Gendered: Mihri Hatun’s Resistance to ‘Femininity'. The Center for Middle Eastern Studies: Sohbet-i Osmani Series (2010).
Lewis, Bernard. Music of a Distant Drum: Classical Arabic, Persian, Turkish, and Hebrew Poems. Princeton University Press; Ltr ptg edition. (2001).

External links
Medieval Women, Poetry and Mihri Hatun by Associate Prof. Dr. Huriye Reis, Hacettepe University, Department of English Language and Literature (in English and Turkish)
Short Biography and One Gazel
On the margins and between the lines: Ottoman women poets from the fifteenth to the twentieth centuries by Didem Havlioglu of the University of Utah

1460s births
1506 deaths
Divan poets from the Ottoman Empire
Women poets from the Ottoman Empire
15th-century poets from the Ottoman Empire
16th-century poets from the Ottoman Empire
15th-century women writers from the Ottoman Empire
16th-century women writers from the Ottoman Empire
Year of birth uncertain